Hugh Leslie Gibb (15 January 1916 – 6 March 1992) was an English drummer, bandleader and the father of musicians Barry, Robin, Maurice and Andy Gibb.  Barry, Robin and Maurice would go on to form the Bee Gees, one of the most successful musical groups of all time, while Andy would have several hits as a solo performer.

Life and career

Early life and family background

Hugh Leslie Gibb was born in Chorlton district in Manchester to Hugh Gibb and Edith Yardley. He said: "I was the oddball in my family 'cause I liked music and the attitude was that it would never do you any good. The main theme then was go to work, have a steady job, and bring your wages home every weekend. A side track from that wasn't right in their eyes. To be a musician was like the old days, you know, when they were considered vagabonds, and that's all I ever wanted to do."

Gibb's father was born in Lanarkshire, Scotland in 1876. His mother was born in Manchester in 1892 to William and Hannah. She was 16 years younger than her husband and became step-mother to his seven children he had from his previous marriage, to Annie, who had died in 1889 at the age of 38. Gibb's grandfather, Thomas Yardley, was born in 1826 and is recorded as a railway worker.

Barbara Pass
Barbara Pass was a dance band vocalist and, on one of her nights off, she went with a friend to another dance hall. Later, she said: "That's where it all started." Hugh escorted Barbara home that night and thereafter romance blossomed. Despite the nightmare of the war, Hugh had fond memories of the time he met his future wife, as he said: "People enjoyed themselves more. Kids to-day think they've done everything by the time they're 18 and have nothing to look forward to." They were married on 27 May 1944 in Manchester. Their first child, daughter Lesley, was born on 12 January 1945. Shortly afterwards, they moved to Scotland, where his band was starting to play in Edinburgh; as Barbara explained: "We lived just at the outskirts of Edinburgh." After a while, Hugh, Barbara and Lesley moved back to Manchester and lived with Barbara's mother, Nora Pass, in Stretford. Then Gibb got a job on the Isle of Man and they moved to its capital, Douglas. Gibb started to play at the Douglas Bay Hotel and the Alexandra, both in Douglas.

On 1 September 1946, his first son Barry Gibb was born at 8:45 a.m. at the Jane Crookall Maternity Home in Douglas. During that same time, Hugh was busy with his music at various hotels in Douglas when Barry was a baby: "I stayed there for [about] 10 years and Joe Loss's band used to be there; that was the big band era." On 22 December 1949, also at the Jane Crookall Maternity Home in Douglas, Hugh's second son Robin Gibb was born at 3:15 a.m.  Later that morning, at 3:50 a.m., his third son Maurice Gibb was born at the same maternity home. In 1955, the Gibbs returned to the Manchester area. On 5 March 1958, Hugh's fourth son Andy Gibb was born in Stretford Memorial Hospital in Manchester.

Career

His band, the Hughie Gibb Orchestra, was firmly ensconced on the circuit of Mecca ballrooms, playing mainly in Northern England and Scotland. Rosalia Black, who was the daughter of the hotel owner, Carlo Raineri, recalls "The band must have been popular because the ballroom was always packed, even though the Joe Loss Orchestra was at the Villa Marina and Ronnie Aldrich, with the Squadronaires, was at the Palace Ballroom."

Hugh was always on the lookout for work. Even as an extremely popular musician, he did not earn very much, and he often put together bands for one-off gigs. One such dance might have been the Invitation Dinner Dance held at London's Metropole Hotel on 24 February 1949; the reception was at 7:00 p.m., and the title of the show was 'Hughie Gibb and his Music', entertaining the people until 1:00 a.m.

Hugh did not actually play on board the ferry, and his band was not paid by Douglas's Corporation (on the Isle of Man), who ran the ferry. Apart from trumpeter Charlie Whewell, others who played in Hugh's band in 1946 consisted of Arthur Crawford (accordion), Jim Caine (piano), Tommy Cowley (bass), Albert Metcalfe (tenor saxophone) and John Knight (trombone).

Aside from being a musician, Hugh's work during the day was delivering bread. As their neighbour, Joan Hill, said: "We were all very poor in those days and Mr. Gibb was a godsend. He used to bring home dozens of loaves that had to be sold before the end of the day - bread must have been much more wholesome in those days - didn't have all the preservatives it does today. Hugh would then be able to sell these off to neighbors at a fraction of the normal cost." Hugh's musical background is credited as the Bee Gees' inspiration to follow a musical career, but his influence on his sons was actually more indirect.

Hugh credited his wife's sister, Peggy, with the idea of emigrating to Australia, as she eventually did with her family, although it was his family that had migrated first. Later, he and Barbara applied for passage to Australia but did little to prepare for the move. As Hugh said: "Because they say, don't dispose of your property until you know what you're doing. Sometimes you have to wait two years; we got it in six weeks." At the beginning of August 1958, the family set sail for Australia.

When the family arrived in Queensland, Hugh found work as a "bush photographer". His photography assignments were not as frequent as he would have liked, so he took on extra work for Scarborough Local Council.

Hugh remembers that the group's break came when television was started in Brisbane around 1960: "We auditioned for one of the variety shows, anything goes right way, they signed us." When the family moved back to Britain, on 7 February 1967, at 7:40 in the morning, the 'phone rang. Robert Stigwood, Brian Epstein's partner, said: "Look, we've been doing a lot of reshuffling in the office here, and we've just come across the acetate you sent us, and we played it. Could you come along and see us this afternoon?" By November 1971, Hugh and Barbara moved to Ibiza, Spain with Andy and granddaughter, Beri.

Later years and death

After Andy Gibb's death in 1988, his father lost interest in life. On 6 March 1992, one day after what would have been Andy's 34th birthday, Hugh Gibb died of internal bleeding, at the age of 76, after years of "heavy drinking". Hugh lies buried in the same cemetery as Andy in the Court of Remembrance section, at Forest Lawn Memorial Park, Los Angeles. Barry Gibb's reaction was "I believe all this was meant to happen. I miss my father of course, but he stopped living when Andy died and I'm sure he's happier now."

References

1916 births
1992 deaths
British male drummers
English drummers
English jazz drummers
English bandleaders
English people of Scottish descent
Photographers from Manchester
20th-century English musicians
English expatriates in Australia
English expatriates in Spain
English expatriates in the United States
Alcohol-related deaths
Burials at Forest Lawn Memorial Park (Hollywood Hills)
Deaths from bleeding
Hugh
Musicians from Manchester
20th-century British male musicians
British male jazz musicians